Cyphosticha panconita is a moth of the family Gracillariidae. It is known from Queensland and New South Wales, Australia.

References

Gracillariinae